"Spaceman" is a song by British rock band Babylon Zoo, released on 15 January 1996 as the lead single from their debut album, The Boy with the X-Ray Eyes (1996). Featuring heavily distorted guitars and metallic, robotic sounding vocals, the song entered the UK Singles Chart at number one on 21 January 1996 following its use in a Levi's jeans television advertisement the previous year; "Spaceman" was the sixth song to reach number one in the UK after being featured in a Levi's advert.

Song history
Promotional copies of "Spaceman" had been distributed, and the Arthur Baker remix was chosen to tie in with the release of a new United Kingdom Levi's advertisement titled "Planet" on 1 December 1995, which was directed by Vaughan Arnell and Anthea Benton. The advertisement concentrated on Baker's sped-up vocal section at the beginning and end of the song, featuring an alien neighbourhood inspired by the 1950s with alien parents awaiting the return of their teen daughter. There was a full version of the sped up vocals called "Spaceman (Zupervarian Mix)". Russian model Kristina Semenovskaya played the daughter, wearing Levi's jeans.

The initial intro to "Spaceman" on the promotional copies, before it was used for the advert, featured Mann's whispering vocals of "I killed your mother, I killed your sister, I killed you all." These lyrics were later taken out of the song and replaced with the more radio friendly Arthur Baker introduction. The "I killed you all" lyric remains buried in the mix. There was a lower budget video made for this version.

In 2006, "Spaceman" featured on trailers for Ant and Dec's film Alien Autopsy, the BBC's children's channel, CBeebies for the animated preschool series Lunar Jim, and Network Ten's advertisement for Battlestar Galactica. "Spaceman" is also used in Eesti otsib superstaari (Pop Idol Estonia). "Spaceman" is also featured in E4's My Mad Fat Diary, in the episode "Ladies and Gentlemen", during the scene where Rae and Finn begin their drive to Knebworth.

Music video 
Following the release of the single a music video was produced, directed by Mark Neale. It features a black-and-white prologue with Jas Mann as a night driver who has a close encounter with aliens appearing from fog on the road, with the vocals sped up. When the vocals decelerate and return to normal pitch, the video alternates between the band playing in an underground place full of young people dancing with the band playing alone in a blue-colored desert landscape, with Mann singing to camera. Finally the vocals are sped up again, during a black-and-white epilogue that returns to the prologue's scene, where aliens go missing in the fog but one of them turns in front of the camera pointing to the night sky, showing that he's the night driver, turned into another alien.

The song in the video (A♭ minor) is recorded a semitone lower than the record (A minor).  The speeded up intro and outro sections are in the 'dominant' key: E♭ minor (video) and E minor (record).

Reception and legacy
Contemporary reception was generally favourable. Chuck Eddy at Entertainment Weekly described the song's "futuristic kitsch" as "both funny and seductive." Music & Media said it's "basically a good pop tune whose hooks grab you by the throat." Music Week gave it four out of five, adding that "the energetic and distinctive guitar rock of Spaceman is featured on the new Levis ad, so expect big sales." Reviewing The Boy with the X-Ray Eyes in Select, Ian Harrison described the song as a "bin-lid dancey metal effort with a weakness for vintage Bowie-isms (done like Bauhaus with synths) and a suspected humour deficiency". Also Helen Lamont of Smash Hits rated the song four out of five. She noted: "The intro sounds just like the ad – all high pitched and squeaky – but then everything takes a turn for the serious. Fear not, though – it is still good – but in a charming slit-your-wrists, top-of-the-rock charts kind of way." David Sinclair of The Times wrote: "A heavily synthesised rocker, with an oddly lurching, varispeed intro, Spaceman is rich in futuristic imagery, with echoes of David Bowie and Gary Numan that extend well beyond its title... With its bright, icy appeal and a moody undercurrent, it sounds as if it should wear well. Like the jeans."

Retrospectively, Noisey UK managing editor Daisy Jones found the song's verses to be lacklustre but the chorus reminiscent of "the sudden sickly swell of euphoria 20 minutes after popping a surprisingly pure pill". Stephen Thomas Erlewine of AllMusic called the track a "bizarre, tuneless collage of hip-hop rhythms, techno keyboards and alternative guitars", that despite sounding distinctive, lacks "any tangible hook to make it memorable". Writer Tim Moore and a Scotsman journalist likened the song to a dirge, and unfavourably compared it to the Arthur Baker (Zupervarian) remix ; Moore attributed the single's success to the Baker (Zupervarian) remix and its Levi's advert exposure. Steven Wells of NME recalled: "Millions of pop kids rushed down Woolies and bought the single – only to get it home to discover to their horror that it was 'good' (like in the advert) for about ten seconds, and then became rubbish. Very rubbish." Colleague Sarah Anderson wrote: "There can be few more crushing letdowns in pop than the full single mix of 'Spaceman'." Singer Katie Melua, who has performed the song live occasionally, has called it "ridiculously catchy" with "bloody weird" lyrics.

MTV UK ranked "Spaceman" as the number-24 single of the 1990s. "Spaceman" was voted number 31 in a 2006 Channel 4 poll of the 50 best songs by one-hit wonders.

Commercial performance
The single charted at number one on the UK Singles Chart, registering first-week sales of 383,000. It became the fastest-selling debut single in British pop music history, and the best-selling single in the United Kingdom in over thirty years, since The Beatles' "Can't Buy Me Love". "Spaceman" became a number one chart hit in 23 countries. As of June 2013, "Spaceman" was the 79th best-selling single in the history of the United Kingdom, selling 1.15 million copies.

Track listings

UK CD1 
 "Spaceman" – 4:41
 "Metal Vision" – 3:48
 "Blue Nude" – 2:09
 "Spaceman" (album version) – 5:42

UK CD2 
 "Spaceman" (album version) – 5:42
 "Spaceman" (Electronic Information) – 7:43
 "Spaceman" (Arthur Meets the Spaceman) – 5:56
 "Spaceman" (E Before I) – 6:37
 "Spaceman" (Morbid Television Control) – 4:40

UK 12-inch single 
A1. "Spaceman" (radio edit) – 4:08
A2. "Spaceman (The 5th Dimension)" – 5:09
B1. "Spaceman" (Arthur Meets the Spaceman) – 5:56
B2. "Spaceman" (E Before I) – 6:37

UK cassette single 
A1. "Spaceman" (radio edit) – 4:08
A2. "Blue Nude" – 2:09
B1. "Metal Vision" – 3:48
B2. "Spaceman (The 5th Dimension)" – 5:09

US and Australian CD single 
 "Spaceman" (radio edit) – 4:08
 "Metal Vision" – 3:48
 "Blue Nude" – 2:09
 "Spaceman (The 5th Dimension) – 5:09

US cassette single 
 "Spaceman" (radio edit) – 4:08
 "Blue Nude" – 2:09

Charts

Weekly charts

Year-end charts

Certifications

Release history

Notable cover versions
 Katie Melua has performed an acoustic version of this song live.

References

1995 debut singles
1995 songs
1996 singles
Babylon Zoo songs
EMI Records singles
European Hot 100 Singles number-one singles
Irish Singles Chart number-one singles
Number-one singles in Austria
Number-one singles in Denmark
Number-one singles in Finland
Number-one singles in Germany
Number-one singles in Norway
Number-one singles in Scotland
Number-one singles in Sweden
Songs about outer space
SNEP Top Singles number-one singles
Song recordings produced by Steve Power
UK Singles Chart number-one singles
Ultratop 50 Singles (Flanders) number-one singles
Ultratop 50 Singles (Wallonia) number-one singles